Royal fern or Royal Fern may refer to:
 Osmunda regalis, a fern native to Europe, Africa and Asia
 Osmunda spectabilis, or American royal fern
 Royal Fern Park, a golf course under development in Llangyfelach, Swansea, Wales